The BioMaPS Institute for Quantitative Biology at Rutgers University in New Jersey is an interdisciplinary Institute whose principal aims are:
 to establish a nationally and internationally recognized research program in quantitative biology; and
 to respond to the need of educating a new generation of life-science researchers with strong quantitative backgrounds in molecular biophysics, structural biology, computational biology and bioinformatics.

The Institute offers graduate education leading to the Doctor of Philosophy (Ph.D.) in Computational Biology and Molecular Biophysics.  This is an interdisciplinary graduate program at Rutgers University at the interface between the Biological, Mathematical, and Physical Sciences (BioMaPS). The program is designed for students with strong backgrounds in physical, mathematical, and computational sciences whose goal is to be at the forefront of life-science research through the use of sophisticated quantitative skills. In addition, the BioMaPS program provides courses and research opportunities for students in the biological sciences who wish to specialize in quantitative biology.

External links
 Rutgers University
 BioMaPS Institute

Rutgers University